The 1999 Ashfield District Council election took place on 6 May 1999 to elect members of Ashfield District Council in Nottinghamshire, England. The whole council was up for election and the Labour party stayed in overall control of the council.

Election result

|}

References

1999 English local elections
1999
1990s in Nottinghamshire